Dorcadion striolatum is a species of beetle in the family Cerambycidae. It was described by Kraatz in 1873. It is known from Georgia, Armenia, Turkey, and possibly Iran.

Varietas
 Dorcadion striolatum var. brunnescens Breuning, 1948
 Dorcadion striolatum var. distinctefasciatum Breuning, 1946
 Dorcadion striolatum var. masculinum Plavilstshikov, 1926

References

striolatum
Beetles described in 1873